The International Critical Commentary (or ICC) is a series of commentaries in English on the text of the Old Testament and New Testament. It is currently published by T&T Clark, now an imprint of Bloomsbury Publishing.

Initially started over one hundred years ago, the International Critical Commentary series has been a highly regarded academic-level commentary on the Bible. It aims to marshall all available aids to exegesis: linguistic, textual, archaeological, historical, literary and theological. No unifying scheme is sought but each scholar has been free to express their expertise.

Originally edited by Samuel Rolles Driver, Alfred A. Plummer and Charles Augustus Briggs (whom the Presbyterian Church in the USA excommunicated for heretical views on Scripture), the series has been in the hands of various editors since. The current editors are Graham I. Davies and Christopher M. Tuckett.

Volumes
  552 pages
  489 pages
  434 pages
  476 pages
  421 pages
  574 pages
  534 pages
  384 pages
  334 pages
  360 pages
  360 pages
  571 pages
  554 pages
  212 pages
  448 pages
  808 pages
  472 pages
  424 pages
  392 pages
  560 pages
  658 pages
  1,396 pages
  416 pages
  557 pages
  478 pages
  600 pages
  424 pages
  560 pages
  515 pages
  350 pages
  731 pages
  807 pages
  789 pages
  317 pages
  592 pages
  368 pages
  740 pages
  740 pages
  692 pages
  1,272 pages
  450 pages
  480 pages
  496 pages
  424 pages
  404 pages
  978 pages
  978 pages
  539 pages
  685 pages
  315 pages
  512 pages
  201 pages
  326 pages
  163 pages
  882 pages
  264 pages
  319 pages
  848 pages
  353 pages
  242 pages
  373 pages
  497 pages

See also 
 Anchor Bible Series
 Exegesis
 Textual criticism
 List of Biblical commentaries

References 

Biblical commentaries
Series of non-fiction books